Chief White Crane Recreation Area is a state recreation area in southeastern South Dakota, United States.

Recreation
There are 145 campsites and 10 camper cabins. The area is popular for fishing, kayaking, and canoeing on Lake Yankton and the Missouri River. In winter months the area is a well-known roosting spot for the Bald eagle along the Missouri River. The campground and recreation area were constructed by the U.S. Army Corps of Engineers (USACE) following construction of the nearby Gavins Point Dam. In 2001 legislation transferred ownership of the recreation area from USACE to the South Dakota Department of Game, Fish and Parks as a part of the Lewis & Clark Recreation Area.

The area is adjacent to Training Dike Recreation Area, along the Missouri River.

See also
List of South Dakota state parks

References

External links
 Chief White Crane Recreation Area - South Dakota Game, Fish & Parks
 U.S. Army Corps of Engineers - Lewis and Clark Lake

Protected areas of Yankton County, South Dakota
State parks of South Dakota
Protected areas established in 2001
2001 establishments in South Dakota